The 2009 AFC Cup Final was a football match played on Tuesday, 3 November 2009 between Al-Kuwait and Al-Karamah. It was the 6th final of the AFC Cup and was the first time the final match to be played in a one-off format. The game was  played at Al Kuwait Sports Club Stadium, being the home ground of Al-Kuwait. Al-Kuwait won the title by winning over Al-Karamah 2-1.

Both finalists were eligible to compete in the play-offs for the 2010 AFC Champions League, subject to AFC's assessment for professionalism based on selected criteria.

Route to the final

Match details

See also
2009 AFC Cup
2009 AFC Champions League Final
2009 AFC President's Cup Final
2009–10 Gulf Club Champions Cup Final

References

Final, 2009 Afc Cup
AFC Cup finals
Kuwait SC matches
International club association football competitions hosted by Kuwait